The Rennell fantail (Rhipidura rennelliana) is a species of bird in the family Rhipiduridae.
It is endemic to Rennell Island (Solomon Islands).

Its natural habitat is subtropical or tropical moist lowland forests.

Description 
The plumage is mostly mouse-brown, while the color of throat is somewhat paler. There is a reddish stripe on the wing. The long tail, which the bird often spreads, is with a pale fringe. Avoids open spaces, preferring forest (mostly virgin ones). This is the only fantail on Rennell Island. The usual sound is piercing and squeaky.

Taxonomy 

Rennell fantail (R. rennelliana) forms a superspecies with: 
 Brown fantail (R. drownei)
 Makira fantail (R. tenebrosa)
 Streaked fantail (R. verreauxi)
 Kadavu fantail (R. personata)
 Samoan fantail (R. nebulosa)

References

Rennell fantail
Birds of Rennell Island
Rennell fantail
Taxonomy articles created by Polbot